Harrogate High School is a comprehensive secondary school in Harrogate, North Yorkshire, England. It has about 600 pupils on roll and approximately 85 full-time teaching staff. The school was awarded specialist Sports College status. The Academy Head is Mark Turner.

History 
The school was founded in 1973 as Harrogate Granby High School by the amalgamation of the original Harrogate High School with Granby Park County Secondary School. Both of these schools were established in the 1960s. 

The original Harrogate High School was a 'Grammar school' whereby it had a selective intake, for those passing or assessed to be above the 11-plus entry level, and took its first pupils in September 1962.  The first headmaster, until his retirement at Easter 1963, was Tom Reginald Lupton. He was succeeded by Mr F.W. Kimber of Goole, who taught German.

When Kimber arrived, the High School had 540 pupils and rising. The school, which had been built at a cost of £240,000, was formally opened upon the completion of building works on Friday 13 March 1964 by Alderman Hyman, chairman of the West Riding County Council, deputising for Sir Edward Boyle (later Baron Boyle of Handsworth), Minister of Education. The latter, whose flight had been delayed by bad weather, paid a visit three months later when he praised the school, especially the 'admirable assembly hall', library and gymnasium, and "first-class headmaster with long Grammar School experience, and a very able and well-qualified staff". By 1972 there were approximately 730 pupils on its roll.

During the speech day and prize-giving at the school on 17 March 1965, Mr F.W. Kimber said:
"We headmasters ... are as a race only too delighted to report excellent examination results, but this particular group of sixth form pupils, perhaps more than any that I have met, emphasise the hollowness of a mere recital of examination performance when this is dissociated from personal qualities and the wider aspects of educational maturity. Rarely have I known sixth form pupils who have shown such balanced interests and outlook and such a sense of social service and responsibility. They have moved on to university, colleges of advanced technology, teacher training colleges, and to commerce. They have set standards of service and responsibility, which I sincerely hope future generations of High School pupils will succeed in maintaining."

The original Granby Park County Secondary School was formed by the amalgamation of New Park Secondary School and Starbeck Secondary School, opening in September 1965 in the brand new school building sited in the middle of the three schools on the campus, also with its own gymnasium, school hall and a 4 storey science/technical block.  Granby Park was a secondary modern school for those below the 11-plus entry level for ages 11-16 and in those days students studied for CSE examinations.  Very often, any pupil at Granby Park who wanted to enter the sixth-form to study for 'A' levels, moved to the High School's sixth-form.

In September 1973 Kimber (head of the High School) became the first headmaster of the newly formed comprehensive school with over 2000 students on its roll-call. Having been established on a large tripartite campus, with soft boundaries between schools, all sharing the sports grounds, swimming pool and car parks there was a relatively easy transition and the newly formed comprehensive school took over the smaller buildings and grounds of the 3rd school on the campus, vacated by St. John Fisher Catholic High School (which relocated to its current site in parkland on the south side of Harrogate), creating a 13-hectare (32 acre) campus bounded by residential housing to the west, the Harrogate Line to the north, Kingsley Drive to the south, and Kingsley Road to the east. The 1st year comprehensive intake were accommodated in the St. John Fisher site, whilst the higher years remained mostly segregated in their lessons, according to their ability/streams in their (former) respective schools with a gradual integration effected by overlapping activities & sports and easier timetabling making wider use of classrooms and science/technical/domestic-science rooms across both sites.  There had been a certain rivalry and cultural differences between the teenagers in the respective schools, (which had been known occasionally to get out of hand) and it was through music, sport and extra-curricular activities that a gradual integration was achieved with, for example, players from the High School's orchestra and Granby Park's Brass Band forming a Concert Wind Band together.

By 1975 the integration was deemed complete by merging the separate cohorts of each of the 4th and 5th years into either one of the main buildings as the 2nd & 3rd years were already 'comprehensive' year intakes.  Granby was eventually dropped from the merged schools' name in September 2005.  

The school now has around 600 students on its roll. The 2008 Ofsted Inspection Report found that the school is satisfactory with good capacity to improve. It also found that the extent to which learners make a positive contribution to the community, and adopt healthy lifestyles and safe practices, is good. In 2009, its pass rate for five or more GCSEs at grades A* to C was 99.3%. In 2010 the school was monitored by Ofsted who deemed the school to be "making good progress in making improvements and good progress in demonstrating a better capacity for sustained improvement."

On 1 June 2012 Harrogate High School converted to an academy.

Harrogate High School announced it is one of 261 schools nationwide to be chosen for the Priority School Building Programme. The new school was built in 2017 on the playing fields and the old campus buildings were completely demolished and the site landscaped.

Harrogate Hockey Club, a club with a team in the National League of the English Hockey League (EHL) have a clubhouse and artificial pitch located within the boundaries of the school.

Academic results
School 2012 examination results at A-level showed an overall pass rate of 92% shows 30% of pupils achieving the top grades of A- B, up 11% from 2011. Year 13 A2 students at Harrogate High School have achieved an overall pass rate of 96% with 39% of pupils achieving A*- B grades.

Notable alumni
Mike Bushell – sports presenter for the BBC
Garry Jennings – guitarist for heavy metal bands Acid Reign, Cathedral, Septic Tank and Lucifer
Mark Wharton – guitarist for heavy metal bands Acid Reign, Cathedral, Cronos

References

External links 
 

Schools in Harrogate
Educational institutions established in 1973
Secondary schools in North Yorkshire
1973 establishments in England
Academies in North Yorkshire